Mohamed Mazouz is a citizen of Morocco who was held in extrajudicial detention in the United States Guantanamo Bay detention camps, in Cuba. His Guantanamo Internment Serial Number was 294.
Joint Task Force Guantanamo counter-terrorism analysts report he was born on December 31, 1973, in Casablanca, Morocco. He was designated as a terrorist entity by the Moroccan Ministry of Justice in 2023, and an international arrest warrant has been issued for his arrest for alleged terrorist acts.

Release
Mizouz was one of the 201 Guantanamo captives released prior to the completion of the Combatant Status Review Tribunals that were initiated in August 2004, following the United States Supreme Court's ruling in Rasul v. Bush.

April 2005 interview
During an interview on April 11, 2005, in the La Gazette du Maroc Mizouz described his capture, and the conditions of his detention and interrogation.
According to Mizouz he had gone to Pakistan to get married.
He was arrested in Pakistan, by Pakistani authorities, on August 26, 2001, while walking with his brother-in-law in Karachi.

He said he hadn't heard from his wife since his capture, and didn't know what had happened to her.

Mizouz described cruel treatment in Pakistani custody.  He described being transferred to American custody in the Kandahar detention facility.

According to Mizouz, his transfer to American custody was in December 2001. Prior to his transfer he was visited by some Americans who said they were from Amnesty International, who he was sure were actually American counter-terrorism analysts.

Mizouz expressed dissatisfaction with efforts of the International Committee of the Red Cross on their behalf, and expressing suspicion that the Red Cross was assisting the American effort:

Mizouz described brutal beatings in Kandahar, being exposed to the freezing cold winter weather, prior to interrogations, and the use of electric shock, during his interrogations, and immersions in freezing cold water.

Mizouz was then transferred to the Bagram Collection Point.  Mizouz said that after his release, when he read about the Abu Ghraib torture and abuse that occurred in 2003 he recognized that all of these techniques were techniques used when he was being held in Bagram in 2002.  He also described injections with psychotropic drugs.

And Mizouz described Americans in Bagram urinating on the Koran.

Mizouz said he was transferred to Guantanamo on June 15, 2006.  Beatings by the guards, mystery injections continued.  He also described all the captives suffering from painful hemorrhoids from the humiliating body cavity searches, forced enemas, and the introduction of drugs via the anus.

With very few exceptions, American spokesmen decline to address claims of abuse from specific Guantanamo captives.  But, they have offered general assurances that American captives receive humane care and treatment.

Moroccan arrest
Mizouz, another former Guantanamo captive named Brahim Benchekroun, and fifteen other Moroccans who were not former Guantanamo captives, were rounded up on November 11, 2005.

Defense Intelligence Agency claims he "returned to terrorism"
The Defense Intelligence Agency asserted Ibrahim Bin Shakaran had "returned to terrorism".

The DIA reported:

Middle East Eye named Mizouz, Mohamed Alami, and Brahim Benchekroun, three former Guantanamo detainees who joined Harakat Sham al-Islam - an organization for Moroccans who planned to travel to Syria to fight in the conflict there.

References

Moroccan extrajudicial prisoners of the United States
Guantanamo detainees known to have been released
Kandahar detention facility detainees
Bagram Theater Internment Facility detainees
Living people
1973 births
People from Casablanca